The 2012–13 season was the 110th in the history of the Southern League, which is an English football competition featuring semi-professional and amateur clubs from the South West, South Central and Midlands of England and South Wales. From the previous season onwards, the Southern League was known as The Evo-Stik League Southern, following a sponsorship deal with Evo-Stik.

Due to step three leagues increasing their number of clubs from 22 to 24 from the 2013–14 season onwards, only two clubs were relegated from the Premier Division, and only one club was relegated from each of Division One Central and South & West this season.

Premier Division
The Premier Division consisted of 22 clubs, including 17 clubs from the previous season and seven new clubs:
Two clubs promoted from Division One Central:
Bedworth United
St Neots Town

Two clubs promoted from Division One South & West:
Bideford
Gosport Borough

Plus:
Kettering Town, demoted from the Conference National for financial reasons 

Hinckley United and Maidenhead United were originally relegated to this division from the Conference North/South, but were reprieved after the liquidation of Darlington and the resignation of Kettering Town from the Conference National. Darlington were relegated to the Northern League, and Kettering applied to join the Southern League, allowing for a further reprieve for Hemel Hempstead Town.

Leamington won the division and were promoted to the Conference North, while play-off winners Gosport Borough were promoted to the Conference South. Hemel Hempstead Town reached the play-off final after two relegation reprieves in the previous three seasons. Only two clubs were relegated this season due to the expansion of the Premier Division to 24 clubs for the next season. Bedworth United were relegated straight back to step 4, while Kettering Town continued their fall to Division One Central.

League table

Play-offs

Semi-finals

Final

Results

Stadia and locations

Division One Central
Division One Central consisted of 22 clubs, including 18 clubs from previous season and four new clubs:
Godalming Town, transferred from Isthmian League Division One South
Guildford City, promoted from the Combined Counties League
Royston Town, promoted from the Spartan South Midlands League
Thatcham Town, transferred from Division One South & West

Burnham won the division on the final day of the season and were promoted to the Premier Division along with play-off winners Biggleswade Town. Woodford United lost all their matches and were the only club relegated from division this season.

League table

Play-offs

Semi-finals

Final

Results

Stadia and locations

Division One South & West
Division One South & West consisted of 22 clubs, including 16 clubs from previous season and four new clubs:
Three clubs relegated from the Premier Division:
Cirencester Town
Evesham United
Swindon Supermarine

Plus:
Merthyr Town, promoted from the Western League
Shortwood United, promoted from the Hellenic League
Winchester City, promoted from the Wessex League

Poole Town won the division in their second season in the league, and were promoted to the Premier Division along with play-off winners Hungerford Town. Winchester City finished bottom and left the Southern League for the Wessex League for the second time in four seasons.

Sholing resigned at the end of the season for financial reasons, and dropped down to the Wessex League.

On 12 May 2013, Abingdon United also resigned from the league for financial reasons, and dropped down to the Hellenic League.

League table

Play-offs

Semi-finals

Final

Results

Stadia and locations

League Cup

The Southern League Cup 2012–13 (billed as the RedInsure Cup 2012–13 for sponsorship reasons) is the 75th season of the Southern League Cup, the cup competition of the Southern Football League.

Preliminary round

First round

Second round

Third Round

Quarter-finals

Semi-final

Final

First leg

Second leg

See also
 Southern Football League
 2012–13 Isthmian League
 2012–13 Northern Premier League

References

External links
Official website

2012-13
7